Albaladejo is a Spanish surname. Notable people with the surname include:

Jonathan Albaladejo (born 1982), Puerto Rican baseball player
Lorenzo Albaladejo Martínez (born 1990), Spanish Paralympic athlete
Miguel Albaladejo (born 1966), Spanish screenwriter and film director
Pierre Albaladejo (born 1933), French rugby union player

Spanish-language surnames